

A tornado outbreak is the occurrence of multiple tornadoes spawned by the same synoptic scale weather system. The number of tornadoes required to qualify as an outbreak typically are at least six to ten, with at least two rotational locations (if squall line) or at least two supercells producing multiple tornadoes.

The tornadoes usually occur within the same day or continue into the early morning hours of the succeeding day, and within the same region. Most definitions allow for a break in tornado activity (time elapsed from the end of the last tornado to the beginning of the next tornado) of six hours. If tornado activity indeed resumes after such a lull, many definitions consider the event to be a new outbreak. A series of continuous or nearly continuous tornado outbreak days is a tornado outbreak sequence. In the United States and Canada, tornado outbreaks usually occur from March through June in the Great Plains, the Midwestern United States, and the Southeastern United States in an area colloquially referred to as Tornado Alley. Tornado outbreaks can also occur during other times of the year and in other parts of the world. A secondary less active and annually inconsistent tornado "season" in the U.S. occurs in late autumn.

Very large tornado outbreaks are known as super outbreaks. The largest tornado outbreak on record was the 2011 Super Outbreak, with 362 tornadoes and about $10 billion in direct damages. It surpassed the 1974 Super Outbreak, in which 148 tornadoes were counted. Both occurred within the United States and Canada. The total number of tornadoes is a problematic method of comparing outbreaks from different periods, however, as many weaker tornadoes, but not stronger tornadoes, are reported in the US in recent decades than in previous ones due to improvements in tornado detection.

See also

Lists of tornadoes and tornado outbreaks

References

Further reading

External links
 US Violent Tornado Outbreak Statistics (SPC)

Tornado

Natural disasters